The 1985 Kentucky Wildcats football team represented the University of Kentucky in the Southeastern Conference (SEC) during the 1985 NCAA Division I-A football season.  In their fourth season under head coach Jerry Claiborne, the Wildcats compiled a 5–6 record (1–5 against SEC opponents), finished in ninth place in the SEC, and were outscored by their opponents, 211 to 194.  

The team played its home games in Commonwealth Stadium in Lexington, Kentucky.

The team's statistical leaders included Bill Ransdell with 1,744 passing yards, Marc Logan with 715 rushing yards, and Cornell Burbage with 418 receiving yards.

Schedule

References

Kentucky
Kentucky Wildcats football seasons
Kentucky Wildcats football